As-Suwayda (also spelled Soweideh or Sweideh or Swaida) is a Syrian village located in the Masyaf Subdistrict in Masyaf District, located west of Hama. According to the Syria Central Bureau of Statistics (CBS), As-Suwayda had a population of 2,703 in the 2004 census. Its inhabitants are predominantly Alawites.

References 

Populated places in Masyaf District
Alawite communities in Syria